Typhina coronata is a species of sea snail, a marine gastropod mollusk in the family Muricidae, the murex snails or rock snails.

Description
The length of the shell attains 21 mm.

Distribution
This marine species was found off Acapulco, Mexico; also off Panama, Peru, Ecuador and the Galapagos Islands.

References

 Houart, R, Buge, B. & Zuccon, D. (2021). A taxonomic update of the Typhinae (Gastropoda: Muricidae) with a review of New Caledonia species and the description of new species from New Caledonia, the South China Sea and Western Australia. Journal of Conchology. 44(2): 103–147.

External links
 Broderip, W. J.; Sowerby, G. B. I. (1832-1833). (Descriptions of new species of shells from the collection formed by Mr. Cuming on the western coast of South America, and among the islands of the southern Pacific Ocean.). Proceedings of the Committee of Science and correspondence of the Zoological Society of London. Part II for 1832: 25–33
 Lesson R.P. (1844). Description de quatre espèces nouvelles de Murex. L'Echo du Monde Savant. 11(23): 536-539; 11(24): 11(24): 568-570
 Hinds, R. B. (1843). [Descriptions of new species of shells collected by Sir Edward Belcher during the voyage of HMS Sulphur. Proceedings of the Zoological Society of London. (1843) 11: 17–19]

coronata
Gastropods described in 1833